Langdale Ferry Terminal is owned and operated by BC Ferries, which provides ferry services from the Sunshine Coast to the Lower Mainland, Gambier Island, and Keats Island in the Canadian province of British Columbia.

Route three is a car/passenger ferry route to Horseshoe Bay in West Vancouver. Route thirteen Gambier Island and Keats Island only offers passenger service.

British Columbia Highway 101 is connected to this terminal through an off-ramp that leads to North Gibsons.

Incidents and accidents 
On 26 March 2019, the Queen of Surrey smashed into a dock with 285 passengers on board at around 08:10. As a result, passengers were stuck on board the vessel for eleven hours. At 17:15, BC Ferries received permission from Transport Canada to use a Seaspan tugboat to free the vessel from the dock, and at 18:15, passengers were allowed to disembark. BC Ferries reported that no spills and no injuries ensued from this incident.

References 

BC Ferries
Ferry terminals in British Columbia